Bathyconus is a subgenus  of sea snails, cone snails, marine gastropod mollusks in the genus Conasprella,  family Conidae, the cone snails and their allies.

In the new classification of the family Conidae by Puillandre N., Duda T.F., Meyer C., Olivera B.M. & Bouchet P. (2015), Bathyconus has become a subgenus of Conasprella: Conasprella (Fusiconus) Tucker & Tenorio, 2009 represented as Conasprella Thiele, 1929

Distinguishing characteristics
The Tucker & Tenorio 2009 taxonomy distinguishes Bathyconus from Conus in the following ways:

 Genus Conus sensu stricto Linnaeus, 1758
 Shell characters (living and fossil species)
The basic shell shape is conical to elongated conical, has a deep anal notch on the shoulder, a smooth periostracum and a small operculum. The shoulder of the shell is usually nodulose and the protoconch is usually multispiral. Markings often include the presence of tents except for black or white color variants, with the absence of spiral lines of minute tents and textile bars.
Radular tooth (not known for fossil species)
The radula has an elongated anterior section with serrations and a large exposed terminating cusp, a non-obvious waist, blade is either small or absent and has a short barb, and lacks a basal spur.
Geographical distribution
These species are found in the Indo-Pacific region.
Feeding habits
These species eat other gastropods including cones.

 Subgenus Bathyconus Tucker & Tenorio, 2009
Shell characters (living and fossil species)
The protoconch is multispiral, the shell is elongated conical in shape, the spire is elevated, the shoulders have nodules at the periphery.  A central cord bisects the early whorls, followed by two to three cords on the outer whorls, and the body whorl of the shell has numerous cords.  The anal notch is deep.  The periostracum is smooth, and the operculum is small.
Radular tooth (not known for fossil species)
The anterior section of the radula is much shorter than posterior section, and the waist is obvious. The blade and posterior blade covers the anterior section of the radular tooth.  A basal spur is present, the barb and blade are short.  The anterior end of the shaft fold is blunt.
Geographical distribution
These species are found throughout the Indo-Pacific region.
Feeding habits
These species are presumed to be vermivorous (meaning that they prey on marine worms) based upon their radular morphology.

Species list
This list of species is based on the information in the World Register of Marine Species (WoRMS) list. Species within the genus Bathyconus include:

 Bathyconus aculeiformis (Reeve, 1844): synonym of  Conasprella aculeiformis Reeve, 1844
 Bathyconus comatosus (Pilsbry, 1904): synonym of  Conasprella comatosa Pilsbry, 1904
 Bathyconus coriolisi (Röckel, Richard & Moolenbeek, 1995): synonym of Conasprella coriolisi (Röckel, Richard & Moolenbeek, 1995)
 Bathyconus dieteri (Moolenbeek, Zandbergen & Bouchet, 2008): synonym of  Conasprella dieteri Moolenbeek, Zandbergen & Bouchet, 2008
 Bathyconus elokismenos (Kilburn, 1975): synonym of Conasprella elokismenos (Kilburn, 1975)
 Bathyconus fijiensis (Moolenbeek, Zandbergen & Bouchet, 2008): synonym of  Conasprella fijiensis Moolenbeek, Röckel & Bouchet, 2008
 Bathyconus hypochlorus (Tomlin, 1937): synonym of Conasprella hypochlorus (Tomlin, 1937)
 Bathyconus insculptus (Kiener, 1845): synonym of  Conasprella insculpta Kiener, 1845
 Bathyconus joliveti (Moolenbeek, Zandbergen & Bouchet, 2008): synonym of  Conasprella joliveti Moolenbeek, Röckel & Bouchet, 2008
 Bathyconus milesi (E.A. Smith, 1887): synonym of  Conus milesi E. A. Smith, 1887
 Bathyconus orbignyi (Audouin, 1831): synonym of  Conasprella orbignyi Audouin, 1831
 Bathyconus pepeiu (Moolenbeek, Zandbergen & Bouchet, 2008): synonym of Conasprella pepeiu (Moolenbeek, Zandbergen & Bouchet, 2008)
 Bathyconus pseudorbignyi (Röckel & Lan, 1981): synonym of  Conasprella pseudorbignyi Röckel & Lan, 1981
 Bathyconus saecularis (Melvill, 1898): synonym of  Conasprella saecularis Melvill, 1898
 Bathyconus tiki (Moolenbeek, Zandbergen & Bouchet, 2008): synonym of Conasprella tiki (Moolenbeek, Zandbergen & Bouchet, 2008)

Significance of "alternative representation"
Prior to 2009, all cone species were placed within the family Conidae and were placed in one genus, Conus. In 2009 however, J.K. Tucker and M.J. Tenorio proposed a classification system for the over 600 recognized species that were in the family. Their classification proposed 3 distinct families and 82 genera for the living species of cone snails, including the family Conilithidae. This classification was based upon shell morphology, radular differences, anatomy, physiology, cladistics, with comparisons to molecular (DNA) studies. Published accounts of genera within the Conidae (or Conilithidae) that include the genus Bathyconus include J.K. Tucker & M.J. Tenorio (2009), and Bouchet et al. (2011).

Testing in order to try to understand the molecular phylogeny of the Conidae was initially begun by Christopher Meyer and Alan Kohn, and is continuing, particularly with the advent of nuclear DNA testing in addition to mDNA testing.

However, in 2011, some experts still prefer to use the traditional classification, where all species are placed in Conus within the single family Conidae: for example, according to the current November 2011 version of the World Register of Marine Species, all species within the family Conidae are in the genus Conus. The binomial names of species in the 82 cone snail genera listed in Tucker & Tenorio 2009 are recognized by the World Register of Marine Species as "alternative representations."  Debate within the scientific community regarding this issue continues, and additional molecular phylogeny studies are being carried out in an attempt to clarify the issue.

All this has been superseded in 2015 by the new classification of the Conidae

References

Further reading 
 Kohn A. A. (1992). Chronological Taxonomy of Conus, 1758-1840". Smithsonian Institution Press, Washington and London.
 Monteiro A. (ed.) (2007). The Cone Collector 1: 1-28.
 Berschauer D. (2010). Technology and the Fall of the Mono-Generic Family The Cone Collector 15: pp. 51-54
 Puillandre N., Meyer C.P., Bouchet P., and Olivera B.M. (2011), Genetic divergence and geographical variation in the deep-water Conus orbignyi complex (Mollusca: Conoidea)'', Zoologica Scripta 40(4) 350-363.

External links
 To World Register of Marine Species
  Gastropods.com: Conidae setting forth the genera recognized therein.
Cone Shells - Knights of the Sea 

Conidae
Gastropod subgenera